Oxycera is a genus of flies in the family Stratiomyidae.

Species
Oxycera abyssinica Bezzi, 1906
Oxycera adusta (Lindner, 1968)
Oxycera albomicans Brunetti, 1920
Oxycera albovittata Malloch, 1917
Oxycera aldrichi Malloch, 1917
Oxycera analis Meigen & Wiedemann, 1822
Oxycera apicalis (Kertész, 1914)
Oxycera approximata Malloch, 1917
Oxycera atra Loew, 1873
Oxycera basalis Zhang, Li & Yang, 2009
Oxycera binotata (Séguy, 1934)
Oxycera centralis Loew, 1863
Oxycera chikuni Yang & Nagatomi, 1993
Oxycera confinis (Lindner, 1965)
Oxycera contusa Cockerell, 1917
Oxycera cuiae Wang, Li & Yang, 2010
Oxycera daliensis Zhang, Li & Yang, 2010
Oxycera dispar (Kertész, 1914)
Oxycera dives Loew, 1845
Oxycera excellens (Kertész, 1914)
Oxycera fallenii Staeger, 1844
Oxycera fasciventris Loew, 1873
Oxycera fenestrata (Kertész, 1914)
Oxycera flava (Lindner, 1938)
Oxycera flavimaculata Li, Zhang & Yang, 2009
Oxycera flavopilosa (Pleske, 1925)
Oxycera fumipennis (Kertész, 1923)
Oxycera galeata (Lindner, 1975)
Oxycera germanica (Szilády, 1932)
Oxycera grancanariensis Frey, 1936
Oxycera grata Loew, 1869
Oxycera guangxiensis Yang & Nagatomi, 1993
Oxycera guizhouensis Yang, Wei & Yang, 2008
Oxycera hirticeps Loew, 1873
Oxycera hybrida Loew, 1873
Oxycera insolata Kühbandner, 1984
Oxycera japonica (Szilády, 1941)
Oxycera kusigematti Nagatomi, 1977
Oxycera laniger (Séguy, 1934)
Oxycera latifrons (Lindner, 1965)
Oxycera leonina (Panzer, 1798)
Oxycera lii Yang & Nagatomi, 1993
Oxycera limbata Loew, 1862
Oxycera liui Li, Zhang & Yang, 2009
Oxycera locuples Loew, 1857
Oxycera lyrifera (Szilády, 1941)
Oxycera madagassica (Lindner, 1966)
Oxycera manens Walker, 1859 
Oxycera marginata Loew, 1859
Oxycera meigenii Staeger, 1844
Oxycera micronigra Yang, Wei & Yang, 2009
Oxycera morrisii Curtis, 1833
Oxycera muscaria (Fabricius, 1794)
Oxycera nana Loew, 1873
Oxycera nigricornis Olivier, 1811
Oxycera nigrisincipitalis Woodley, 2001
Oxycera nigriventris Loew, 1873
Oxycera ningxiaensis Yang, Yu & Yang, 2012
Oxycera notata Loew, 1873
Oxycera ochracea (Vaillant, 1950)
Oxycera orientalis (Lindner, 1974)
Oxycera pardalina Meigen, 1822
Oxycera picta Wulp, 1867
Oxycera pseudoamoena Dušek & Rozkošný, 1974
Oxycera pygmaea (Fallén, 1817)
Oxycera qiana Yang, Wei & Yang, 2009
Oxycera qinghensis Yang & Nagatomi, 1993
Oxycera quadrilineata Ustuner & Hasbenli, 2007
Oxycera quadripartita (Lindner, 1940)
Oxycera rara (Scopoli, 1763)
Oxycera rozkosnyi Yang, Yu & Yang, 2012
Oxycera rufifrons Loew, 1873
Oxycera semilimbata (Lindner, 1966)
Oxycera sibirica (Szilády, 1941)
Oxycera signata Brunetti, 1920
Oxycera sinica (Pleske, 1925)
Oxycera stigmosa (Kertész, 1916)
Oxycera stuckenbergi (Lindner, 1961)
Oxycera submaculata Nartshuk & Rozkošný, 1984
Oxycera sumbana (Lindner, 1951)
Oxycera tangi (Lindner, 1940)
Oxycera tenebricosa (Vaillant, 1952)
Oxycera tenuis (Lindner, 1965)
Oxycera terminata Meigen & Wiedemann, 1822
Oxycera tibialis Meijere, 1907
Oxycera torrentium (Vaillant, 1950)
Oxycera tricolor Loew, 1873
Oxycera trilineata (Linnaeus, 1767)
Oxycera trispila Bezzi, 1909
Oxycera turcica Ustuner & Hasbenli, 2004
Oxycera variegata Olivier, 1811
Oxycera varipes Loew, 1870
Oxycera vertipila Yang & Nagatomi, 1993
Oxycera whitei Brunetti, 1923
Oxycera zambesina (Lindner, 1961)

References

Stratiomyidae
Brachycera genera
Taxa named by Johann Wilhelm Meigen
Diptera of North America
Diptera of Africa
Diptera of Asia
Diptera of Europe